Heir Apparent is an American heavy/progressive metal band from Seattle, formed in 1983.

History 
Heir Apparent was formed in 1983 in Seattle by guitarist Terry Gorle. Vocalist Paul Davidson, bassist Derek Peace, and drummer Jim Kovach joined with Gorle to form Heir Apparent's original lineup. In July 1984, the band entered Triad Studios in Redmond, WA to record a five-song demo that received local airplay on KISW and KZOK. A month after recording their first demo in 1984 Jim Kovach was replaced by Ray Schwartz (using the name Raymond Black). This lineup recorded Heir Apparent's debut studio album Graceful Inheritance.
The album was released for European market in January 1986 by an independent French label Black Dragon Records. Supported by UK's Metal Hammer magazine, Heir Apparent toured France, Netherlands, and Germany in May and June 1986, originally as support act, but ending as headliner on tour with Savage Grace. Germany's Rock Hard gave the album a rating of 49/50 points in the February 1986 issue. Encouraged by good sales, Black Dragon re-released the album in October 1986, this time on CD, making it one of the first CD's released by an independent label in Europe. Graceful Inheritance was never released in the US in the 1980s, the group's home country. Graceful Inheritance was ranked No. 188 in the German hardcover book, Best of Rock and Metal – Top 500 Albums of All Time, published in 2005.

Following the departure of lead vocalist Paul Davidson in 1987, Steve Benito took over the singing duties. Also, Heir Apparent's lineup was changed into a quintet by adding a keyboard player Mike Jackson. The new lineup recorded Heir Apparent's second studio album One Small Voice, which marked a musical shift towards the more technical sound of progressive metal, compared to the traditional heavy and power metal style of the previous release. In the summer of 1988, Heir Apparent had their first large arena performance, serving as an opening act for David Lee Roth, in the Seattle Center Coliseum. Soon after that, the band had signed a seven-album contract in 1988 in a joint venture with Capitol Records/Metal Blade, but suddenly dissolved even before the official release of One Small Voice in June 1989. Without a concert support, and with the emergence of grunge in the Seattle area, the second album did not reach the debut's underground success and critical acclaim until many years later, compelling the Greek label Arkeyn Steel Records to release a digitally remastered limited edition of One Small Voice with bonus tracks and a live DVD from a 1988 concert video of this lineup in 2010.

The Germany's label Hellion Records released the Triad demo compilation album in late 1999, along with the re-issue of the band's first album Graceful Inheritance. The band stayed inactive until 2000 when guitarist Terry Gorle was invited to perform at Wacken Open Air festival. Gorle reunited with the original rhythm section of Ray Schwartz and Derek Peace, with addition of Michael James Flatters on vocals. Following that comeback performance, Terry Gorle led several different lineups in concerts between 2002 and 2004. The 2004 lineup of Terry Gorle (guitar), Bobby Ferkovich (bass), Op Sakiya (keyboards), Jeff McCormack (drums) and Peter Orullian (vocals) reunited to perform in Europe in November 2006, headlining Germany's Keep It True festival, and two additional shows in Greece.

In January 2012, Heir Apparent's original musicians (Gorle, Schwartz, and Peace) performed with Jeff Carrell on vocals at the Metal Assault II Festival in Germany, with additional concerts in Athens and Thessaloniki Greece in celebration of the 25th anniversary of Graceful Inheritance.

In October 2015, Heir Apparent performed their first concert in Italy at the Play It Loud Festival with vocalist Will Shaw and keyboardist Op Sakiya joining Gorle, Peace, and Schwartz. During 2016, Heir Apparent has co-headlining festival concerts in Greece at Up the Hammers and Germany at Keep It True. 2016 also brought limited edition releases on vinyl of material from the 1983 Nemesis demo, 1984 Inception Day demo, 1987–88 Triad demos, and Graceful Inheritance.

Heir Apparent's third album, The View from Below, was released worldwide in October 2018 on No Remorse Records with Will Shaw on vocals, Terry Gorle on guitar, Derek Peace on bass, Ray Schwartz on drums, and Op Sakiya on keyboards. The album was highly rated by numerous magazines and journalists. In 2019, Heir Apparent performed at the Rock Hard Festival, as well as the Saturday headliner at Headbangers Open Air Festival in Germany. Each festival appearance was followed by club shows in Netherlands.

Musical influences 
On their official Myspace page, the band stated Black Sabbath, Dio, Judas Priest, Iron Maiden, Pink Floyd, Rainbow and Deep Purple as their main musical influences. They were often compared to contemporaries Queensrÿche.

Band members

2019 lineup 
Terry Gorle – guitars
Derek Peace – bass
Ray Schwartz – drums
Will Shaw – vocals
Op Sakiya – keyboards

Former members 
Vocals
Paul Davidson (1983–1986)
Steve Benito (1987–1989)
Michael James Flatters (2000)
Bryan Hagan (2003)
Peter Orullian (2004–2006)
Mike Blair (2003)
Jeff Carrell (2012 tour)
Mike Gorham (2013)

Bass
Derek Peace (1983–1989) (2000) (2012)
Duane Bakke (1986)
Randy Nelson (1987)
Bobby Ferkovich (2004–2006)

Drums
Jim Kovach (1983–1984)
Ray Schwartz (1984–1989) (2000) (2012)
Jeffrey McCormack (2004–2006)
Clint Clark (2003–2004)

Keyboards
Nathan McCoy (1985)
Mike Jackson (1987–1989)
Op Sakiya (2004–2006)

Discography

Studio albums 
 Graceful Inheritance (1986), Black Dragon
 One Small Voice (1989), Capitol/Metal Blade
 The View From Below (2018), No Remorse

Reissues 
 Graceful Inheritance (1999 – CD), Hellion
 Triad (1999 – CD), Hellion
 One Small Voice (2010 – CD/DVD), Arkeyn Steel
 Graceful Inheritance (2012 – CD/DVD), Death Rider
 Graceful Inheritance (2015 – vinyl), NW Metalworx
 One Small Voice (2021 – CD, vinyl), NW Metalworx
 Foundations 1 & 2 (2021 – CD), VIC Records

Compilation albums 
 One Small Voice (digital remaster with bonus tracks), Riviera DVD (2010), Arkeyn Steel
 Graceful Inheritance (digital remaster with bonus tracks and 1984 demo), LiveTime DVD (2012), Death Rider
 Foundations (2016), Floga Records

References

External links 
 
 
 

Musical groups established in 1983
Musical groups from Seattle
American power metal musical groups
American progressive metal musical groups